South Africa women's cricket team toured Australia in November 2016. The tour consisted of a series of five One Day Internationals, with the first three being part of the 2014–16 ICC Women's Championship. Australia won the series 4–0 with the fourth match of the series ending in a tie.

Squads

Kristen Beams was ruled out of the last two matches of the series after she broke her little finger in her right hand in the third match.

Practice match: Australia Governor-General's XI v South Africa Women

ODI series

1st ODI

2nd ODI

3rd ODI

4th ODI

5th ODI

References

External links
 Series home at ESPN Cricinfo

International cricket competitions in 2016–17
2014–16 ICC Women's Championship
2016–17 Australian women's cricket season
Australia 2016
2016 in South African cricket
South Africa 2016
2016 in women's cricket
cricket